Bojaskinskia is a genus of beetles in the family Buprestidae, containing the following species:

 Bojaskinskia flaviventris (Graffe, 1868)
 Bojaskinskia kleinschmidti Fairmaire, 1878

References

Buprestidae genera